Dennis Patrick Leonard (born May 8, 1951) is a former pitcher for the Kansas City Royals in the late 1970s and early 1980s.  He retired in 1986 due to injuries.

Born in Brooklyn, Leonard attended Oceanside High School on Long Island, then played college baseball for and graduated from Iona College. He was drafted by the Royals in the second round of the 1972 draft and made his major league debut on September 4, 1974. In 1975, his first full year with the Royals, he achieved a 15-7 record.

Leonard later recorded three 20-win seasons, to become the only pitcher in Royals history to do it. He started nine post-season games for the Royals between 1976 and 1981, ending with a record of 3-5, including a 1-1 record in the 1980 World Series against the Philadelphia Phillies.

From 1975 to 1981, Leonard won 130 games, the most by any right-handed pitcher in Major League Baseball.

Towards the end of his career, Leonard missed most of the remaining seasons due to knee injuries. His final season was in 1986, where he ended up with an 8-13 record.  Besides his rookie season of 1974, this was his only season with a losing record.

Leonard finished his career as the Royals’ all-time leader in complete games (103) and shutouts (23), and was second in wins (144). He also held the club's single-season bests in starts (40), complete games (21), innings pitched (294.2) and strikeouts (244).

See also

List of Major League Baseball annual wins leaders
List of Major League Baseball players who spent their entire career with one franchise

References

External links
Career statistics and player information from Baseball-Reference, or Baseball-Reference (Minors)

1951 births
Living people
American League wins champions
Baseball players from New York (state)
Fort Myers Royals players
Fort Myers Sun Sox players
Gulf Coast Royals players
Iona Gaels baseball players
Kansas City Royals players
Kingsport Royals players
Lobos de Arecibo players
Major League Baseball pitchers
Memphis Chicks players
Omaha Royals players
People from Oceanside, New York
Sportspeople from Brooklyn
Baseball players from New York City
Waterloo Royals players